The 2019 Northeast Conference men's soccer season was the 39th season of men's varsity soccer in the conference.

The defending regular-season and tournament champion, LIU Brooklyn, was replaced by the unified LIU athletic program during the 2019 preseason (see below).

With one week left on the season, Merrimack clinched the regular season championship with an 8–0–0 record. Due to their reclassification, they could not compete in the NEC tournament.

Changes from 2018 
Merrimack College joined the Northeast Conference from Division II Northeast-10 Conference. They are not eligible this year for the NEC tournament.

On October 3, 2018 Long Island University announced that it would combine its two existing athletic programs—NEC member LIU Brooklyn and the Division II program at LIU Post—into a single Division I program under the LIU name. The new LIU program, named the LIU Sharks, maintains LIU Brooklyn's prior memberships in Division I and the NEC. The unified men's soccer program is now based at the LIU Post campus in the Nassau County community of Brookville, New York.

Teams 

Notes:

All records, appearances, titles, etc. are from time with current school only, except for LIU.
Records for LIU Post included in the LIU listing because Post's final head coach was named head coach of the newly unified LIU program. 
Years at school does not includes current season.
Overall and NEC records are from time at current school and are before the beginning of the season.

Preseason

Rankings
LIU, the reigning NEC Champions, were not picked as favorites to this year. This is due to LIU losing six players from last year and the program starting with a new head coach. Saint Francis (PA) finished in second place last year and received the most first place votes. Second was St. Francis Brooklyn, which did not do well last year – missing the playoffs for the first time since 2012, but the Terriers are perennial winners in the NEC, having captured the most championships in conference history.

() first place votes

Regular season
The biggest upset of the season was accomplished by Fairleigh Dickinson as they defeated #23 UConn on the road 2–1. The largest margin of defeat was 0–7, as Sacred Heart lost to NJIT in their season opener. The largest margin of victory was 6–0, as Merrimack defeated Robert Morris at home. One of the season's best goals made ESPN SportsCenter's Top 10 list, a bicycle kick goal by St. Francis Brooklyn Terrier's El Mahdi Youssoufi against Central Connecticut was ranked 7th. With one week left on the season, Merrimack clinched the regular season championship with an 8–0–0 record. Due to their reclassification, they could not compete in the NEC tournament.

Notes: All times Eastern Standard time and national ranking is from United Soccer Coaches (USC) poll.

Week 1 (Aug 26–Sep 1) 

Schedule and results:

NEC weekly awards

Week 2 (Sep 2–8) 

Schedule and results:

NEC Weekly Awards

Week 3 (Sep 9–15) 

NEC Weekly Awards

Week 4 (Sep 16–22) 

NEC Weekly Awards

Week 5 (Sep 23–29) 

NEC Weekly Awards

Week 6 (Sep 30–Oct 6) 

NEC Weekly Awards

Week 7 (Oct 7–Oct 13) 

NEC Weekly Awards

Week 8 (Oct 14–Oct 20) 

NEC Weekly Awards

Week 9 (Oct 21–Oct 27) 

NEC Weekly Awards

Week 10 (Oct 28–Nov 3) 

NEC Weekly Awards

Week 11 (Nov 4–Nov 10) 

NEC Weekly Awards

Against other conferences 

Regular Season

Post Season

Results

All-NEC awards and teams

Rankings

National

sources

Regional Ranking - Northeast United Soccer Coaches

source

Postseason

NEC tournament

 * After 2OT, FDU defeated SFPA in penalty kicks 3-1 
 # After 2OT, FDU defeated LIU in penalty kicks 3-2

NCAA tournament

See also 
 2019 NCAA Division I men's soccer season
 2019 Northeast Conference Men's Soccer Tournament

References 

 
2019 NCAA Division I men's soccer season